The Department of Mines, Industry Regulation and Safety is a department of the Government of Western Australia. The department was formed on 1 July 2017, out of the former Department of Mines and Petroleum  and Department of Commerce.

A restructuring of the Western Australian government departments was part of Mark McGowan's election campaign and, in the month after taking office, the number of government departments was reduced from 41 to 25.

The department, through the Geological Survey of Western Australia, operates the Minedex website, which contains comprehensive information on mining and exploration sites and projects in Western Australia.

In May 2021, the department was one of eight Western Australian Government departments to receive a new Director General with Richard Sellers being appointed to the role effective from 31 May 2021 after his predecessor, David Smith, had retired.

References

External links
 Government of Western Australia website
 Department of Mines, Industry Regulation and Safety
 Mines and Mineral Deposits (MINEDEX) Information on mines, mineral deposits and prospects in Western Australia

Mines
Mining in Western Australia
2017 establishments in Australia
Government agencies established in 2017